The Doctors Company is a medical malpractice insurance company headquartered outside Napa, California, USA.

Description
The Doctors Company claims to be the largest physician-owned medical malpractice insurer in the U.S., with 80,000 insureds nationwide, $6.2 billion in assets, $2.3 billion in member surplus, and a financial strength rating of A from A. M. Best and Fitch Ratings in fiscal year 2020. 

Founded in 1976, The Doctors Company operates as a member-owned interinsurance exchange, with a number of wholly owned subsidiaries, and is led by a 14-member Board of Governors. 

In 2008, The Doctors Company merged with Los Angeles-based SCPIE Holdings, Inc.

In October 2010, the company completed a $386 million purchase of American Physicians Capital, Inc. 

On October 19, 2011, The Doctors Company acquired FPIC Insurance Group, Inc., and its subsidiaries First Professionals Insurance Company, Inc.; Advocate, MD Insurance of the Southwest, Inc.; Anesthesiologists Professional Assurance Company; and Intermed Insurance Company.

On June 17, 2014, The Doctors Company acquired Medical Advantage Group, a provider of healthcare, electronic health record (EHR), and telehealth consulting services. 

On August 8, 2016, The Doctors Company created an excess and surplus lines subsidiary, TDC Specialty Underwriters, to facilitate expansion of its product and service offerings to a broader and changing array of healthcare industry insurance buyers. 

On July 31, 2019, The Doctors Company completed the purchase of Hospitals Insurance Company and FOJP Service Corporation. The transaction created Healthcare Risk Advisors, a new service unit that provides third-party insurance and risk management advisory services. 

Collectively, The Doctors Company, Medical Advantage Group, TDC Specialty Underwriters, and Healthcare Risk Advisors form the TDC Group of companies (TDC Group). 

In September 2021, The Doctors Company was certified as a Great Place to Work(R) for 2021 to 2022.

Tribute Plan 
In 2007, The Doctors Company launched a retirement benefit for members called the Tribute Plan. The plan’s purpose is to reward members for loyalty to the company and for providing outstanding patient care. The company sets aside funds for eligible members, and those members receive a financial award when they meet plan criteria upon retirement from the practice of medicine.

References

External links 
 http://www.thedoctors.com

Medical malpractice
Insurance companies of the United States
Financial services companies established in 1976
Companies based in Napa County, California
1976 establishments in California